The Humphreys County School District is a public school district with its administrative offices in Belzoni, Mississippi (USA). The district's boundaries parallel that of Humphreys County.

History
In 2019, the state Board of Education voted to take over the Humphreys County School District, as well as the Yazoo City School District, and incorporated them into a new statewide "achievement district" ; the move came after the school districts were rated as chronically underperforming in terms of student academic achievement.

Schools
Humphreys County High School
Humphreys County Vocational Tech.
Humphreys Junior High School
O. M. McNair Upper Elementary School
Ida Greene Lower Elementary School

Demographics

2006-07 school year
There were a total of 1,840 students enrolled in the Humphreys County School District during the 2006–2007 school year. The gender makeup of the district was 50% female and 50% male. The racial makeup of the district was 96.74% African American, 1.79% White, 1.41% Hispanic, and 0.05% Native American. 94.2% of the district's students were eligible to receive free lunch.

Previous school years

Accountability statistics

See also

List of school districts in Mississippi

References

External links
 
 

Education in Humphreys County, Mississippi
School districts in Mississippi